Ittijah or "Union of Arab Community-Based Associations" is a network for Palestinian non-governmental organizations (NGOs) founded in 1995 in Israel. The organization's stated goals are promoting Palestinian Arab civil society and advocating political, economic and social change for Palestinians who are denied access to infrastructure and services "due to discriminatory practices and policies of the (Israeli) State". Based in Haifa, it is dedicated to coordinating activities and strategies of member organizations while fostering advocacy, capacity-building, and networking.

Ittijah's advocacy efforts concentrate on building awareness of the social, political and economic needs of Palestinian Arabs at the (inter-Palestinian), regional (Arab) and international levels. Advocacy is directed at governments, civil society groups, donor agencies, other indigenous peoples and human rights agencies, unions, and Palestinian solidarity groups. Ittijah hosts regular Ambassadorial study days and solidarity delegations, produces fact sheet publications, and arranges conferences and meetings.

Ittijah's capacity building efforts strive to increase the human, technical, financial and educational resources of its member organizations. Ittijah places international volunteers with local organizations and provides translation assistance with English language correspondence.

Ittijah's networking efforts are engaged at the grassroots through international levels extending from field-based networking with women's and youth groups at the local level through regional inter-Arab and international levels. Particular attention is paid to developing a network of specialists engaged in building civil society infrastructure, communication and cooperation. Ittijah's helped create the "Youth Network," a collaboration between ten Community-based Associations that involved in a year-long project with participating Palestinian youth from diverse regions.

Conferences
In 2000, Ittijah arranged a regional conference in Cyprus for Palestinian civil society groups from all parts of historical Palestine and Lebanon. Three Palestinian networks attended; Ittijah: Union of Arab Community-Based Associations; PNGO (The Palestinian NGO Network in the West Bank and Gaza Strip), and The Collective Forum for Palestinian NGOs in Lebanon. The conference noted the indivisible nature of the Palestinian people, warned against accepting divisions imposed upon them by others, and defined the role of the three networks in working towards a unified Palestinian civil society, including Palestinians living in Israel, the West Bank and Gaza Strip, and the large Palestinian refugee communities in Lebanon.

Ittijah also attended the Durban World Conference against Racism in 2001. Ittijah facilitated communication between Palestinian NGOs on the issue of racism, particularly what it believes is Israeli-state racism against Palestinian citizens, and discriminatory practices in the West Bank and Gaza Strip.

Ittijah sponsored a 2002 conference "An End to Borders: Arab Civil Society Takes up the Challenge" in partnership with the Cairo Institute for Human Rights Studies. The conference created important links between Palestinian civil society organizations inside Israel with partners in the wider Arab world.

Ameer Makhoul Arrest
In May, 2010, Ittijah's director, Ameer Makhoul was arrested by the Israeli Shin Bet and accused of meeting with a Hezbollah spy who recruited him to engage in espionage against Israel. An Israeli court sealed his arrest under gag order at the request of the security services. Neither his name nor his detention could be reported in the Israeli media. Nevertheless, an Israeli online news outlet and foreign blog did break the gag and report his identity. Jaja reportedly helped Ittijah purchase the building housing its offices.

Makhoul later admitted to spying for Hezbollah, as part of a plea bargain. The Haifa District Court sentenced Makhoul in January 2011 to "nine years in prison and another year suspended sentence for charges of spying and contact with a foreign agent from the Lebanon-based Hezbollah militant organization."

Other activities
In 2003, Ittijah issued a petition protesting the attempted murder of Arab Knesset Member Issam Makhoul. On Friday, 24 October 2003, a bomb was placed under MK Makhoul's car. Ittijah argued that the anonymous attack was the result of public incitement against the Arab leaders by the Israeli government. Ittijah asked the government to step back from its attacks that create an uncontrollable atmosphere of violence. Thirty-four Arab, non-governmental organizations in Israel were initial signatories to the petition calling for defense of the democratic right of Arab Israelis to take part in Israel's public and political life.

In August 2004, Ittijah achieved Special Consultative status from the Economic and Social Council of the United Nations, the first Palestinian NGO within Israel to gain consultative status with a United Nations council.

See also

Abnaa el-Balad

References

External links
Critical description of Ittijah by NGO Watch

Human rights organizations based in Israel
Non-governmental organizations involved in the Israeli–Palestinian conflict
Organizations based in the State of Palestine
Supraorganizations